is a private university in Otsu, Shiga, Japan, established in 2003.

Notable alumni
 Ai Aoki (synchronised swimmer)
 Tetsuya Funatsu - football player
 Kai Hirano - football player
 Shota Imai - football player
 Naoki Inoue (footballer)
 Gakuto Kondo - football player
 Riki Matsuda - football player
 Riku Matsuda - football player
 Keisuke Takabatake - basketball player
 Takashi Uchino - football player
 Naoyuki Yamada - football player

External links
 Official website 

Educational institutions established in 2003
Private universities and colleges in Japan
Universities and colleges in Shiga Prefecture
Sports universities and colleges
Buildings and structures in Ōtsu

2003 establishments in Japan